Kaczmarski is a Polish surname. Notable people with the surname include:

Jacek Kaczmarski (1957–2004), Polish singer, songwriter, poet, and writer
Nicole Kaczmarski (born 1981), American basketball player and sports announcer

Polish-language surnames